John Sackville (died 1619), of Brede and of Sedlescombe, Sussex, was an English politician.

Family
Sackville was the son of Christopher Sackville, MP.

Career
He was a Member (MP) of the Parliament of England for East Grinstead in 1563.

References

16th-century births
1619 deaths
People from Brede, East Sussex
John
English MPs 1563–1567
People from Sedlescombe